Olivia Miles (born January 29, 2003) is an American college basketball player for the Notre Dame Fighting Irish of the Atlantic Coast Conference (ACC).

High school career
Born in Summit, New Jersey and later a resident of Phillipsburg, New Jersey, Miles played basketball for Blair Academy in Blairstown, New Jersey. In her junior season, she averaged 13.6 points, 8.1 rebounds and 7.6 assists per game, leading her team to the Prep A state title. Miles competed for the Philadelphia Belles on the Amateur Athletic Union circuit, with whom she won a Nike Elite Youth Basketball League title in June 2019. In addition to basketball, she played soccer in high school. Miles was selected to the Jordan Brand Classic roster. Rated a five-star recruit by ESPN, she committed to play college basketball for Notre Dame after also considering Stanford and North Carolina.

College career
Miles opted to enroll early at Notre Dame and joined the team on January 25, 2021. Over six games in her first season, she averaged 9.3 points and 3.5 assists per game. On November 21, 2021, Miles posted 14 points and 14 assists, three short of the program single-game record, in a 94–35 win over Bryant. On December 8, she joined Marina Mabrey as the only Notre Dame freshmen to record a triple-double, with 11 points, 13 rebounds and 13 assists in a 73–56 win against Valparaiso. Miles scored a season-high 30 points in a 74–61 win against Boston College on January 30, 2022. In the first round of the NCAA tournament, she became the first freshman in women's or men's tournament history to register a triple-double, with 12 points, 11 rebounds and 11 assists in an 89–78 victory over UMass. As a freshman, Miles averaged 13.7 points, 5.7 rebounds and 7.4 assists per game, ranking second to Caitlin Clark in assists among NCAA Division I players. She was named first-team All-Atlantic Coast Conference (ACC).

National team career
Miles played for the United States national under-16 team at the 2019 FIBA Under-16 Americas Championship in Chile. She averaged 5.2 points, 2.2 rebounds and 7.5 assists per game, helping her team win the gold medal.

Career Statistics

College

|-
| style="text-align:left;"| 2020-21
| style="text-align:left;"| Notre Dame
| 6 || 0 || 22.7 || 51.1 || 10.0 || 46.7 || 3.7 || 3.5 || 1.2 || 0.2 || 3.0 || 9.3 

|-
| style="text-align:left;"| 2021-22
| style="text-align:left;"| Notre Dame
| 33 || 33 || 33.4 || 45.5 || 27.0 || 67.7 || 5.7 || 7.4 || 1.8 || 0.2 || 3.8 || 13.7 

|-
| style="text-align:left;"| 2022-23
| style="text-align:left;"| Notre Dame
| 13 || 13 || 29.9 || 50.7 || 23.3 || 79.4 || 8.0 || 7.5 || 2.5 || 0.3 || 3.4 || 15.2 
|}

References

External links
Notre Dame Fighting Irish bio
USA Basketball bio
ESPN Player Overview

2003 births
Living people
American women's basketball players
Basketball players from New Jersey
Blair Academy alumni
Sportspeople from Summit, New Jersey
Sportspeople from Warren County, New Jersey
People from Phillipsburg, New Jersey
Notre Dame Fighting Irish women's basketball players
Point guards
American sportspeople of Jamaican descent
All-American college women's basketball players